{{DISPLAYTITLE:C24H33NO3}}
The molecular formula C24H33NO3 (molar mass: 383.52 g/mol, exact mass: 383.2460 u) may refer to:

 Denaverine
 Guineesine
 Naftidrofuryl, also known as nafronyl

Molecular formulas